Pedro Cisneros from Cuba represented his country at the 6 Metre Sailing at the 1924 Summer Olympics in Le Havre, France.

References

Sources
 
 

Sailors at the 1924 Summer Olympics – 6 Metre
Olympic sailors of Cuba
Cuban male sailors (sport)
Year of birth missing
Year of death missing